Decomposed granite is a kind of granite rock that is weathered to the point that the parent material readily fractures into smaller pieces of weaker rock. Further weathering yields material that easily crumbles into mixtures of gravel-sized particles known as grus that further may break down to produce a mixture of clay and silica sand or silt particles. Different specific granite types have differing propensities to weather, and so differing likelihoods of producing decomposed granite. It has practical uses that include its incorporation into roadway and driveway paving materials, residential gardening materials in arid environments, as well as various types of walkways and heavy-use paths in parks. Different colors of decomposed granite are available, deriving from the natural range of granite colors from different quarry sources, and admixture of other natural and synthetic materials can extend the range of decomposed granite properties.

Definition and composition

Decomposed granite is rock of granitic origin that has weathered to the point that it readily fractures into smaller pieces of weak rock. Further weathering produces rock that easily crumbles into mixtures of gravel-sized particles, sand, and silt-sized particles with some clay. Eventually, the gravel may break down to produce a mixture of silica sand, silt particles, and clay. Different specific granite types have differing propensities to weather, and so differing likelihoods of producing decomposed granite.

The parent granite material is a common type of igneous rock that is granular, with its grains large enough to be distinguished with the unaided eye (i.e., it is phaneritic in texture); it is composed of plagioclase feldspar, orthoclase feldspar, quartz, mica, and possibly other minerals. The chemical transformation of feldspar, one of the primary constituents of granite, into the clay mineral kaolin is one of the important weathering processes. The presence of clay allows water to seep in and further weaken the rock allowing it to fracture or crumble into smaller particles, where, ultimately, the grains of silica produced from the granite are relatively resistant to weathering, and may remain almost unaltered.

Uses

Decomposed granite, as a crushed stone form, is used as a pavement building material. It is used on driveways, garden walkways, bocce courts and pétanque terrains, and urban, regional, and national park walkways and heavy-use paths. DG can be installed and compacted to meet handicapped accessibility specifications and criteria, such as the ADA standards in the U.S.  Different colors are available based on the various natural ranges available from different quarry sources, and polymeric stabilizers and other additives can be included to change the properties of the natural material. Decomposed granite is also sometimes used as a component of soil mixtures for cultivating bonsai.

See also
 Crushed rock
 Chipseal

References

Granite
Building stone
Pavements
Road construction
Earthworks (engineering)
Natural materials
Stone (material)